Shangri-La Plaza is a musical-comedy pilot made for CBS in 1990.

It was directed by Nick Castle and written and created by Mark Mueller and Nick Castle. It starred The Office’s Melora Hardin, Academy Award Nominee Chris Sarandon, jazz singer Carmen Lundy, and Broadway's original Beast and Javert (of Beauty and the Beast and Les Misérables) Terrence Mann, a two-time Tony Award Nominee for Best Actor. It also featured Tony Award-winning choreographer and tap dancer Savion Glover in one of his first television appearances, as well as eight-year-old Allison Mack, of Smallville fame. Michael Peters, a Tony Award winner for his work on Broadway's Dreamgirls, was the choreographer.

Called a cult musical in a 2020 feature article in Los Angeles Magazine titled "Shangri-La Plaza, the Star-Studded All-Musical Sitcom Time Forgot," the all-sung 30 minute television show's history was recounted by the stars and creators in honor of its 30th anniversary.

Shangri-La Plaza was filmed on location in an actual mini-mall at the corner of Vineland Avenue and Burbank Boulevard in North Hollywood, California. Its colorful design was the topic of a Washington Post story in 1990 describing its cultural and architectural impact on the Los Angeles neighborhood in which it was set. Emmy Award-winning art director Jeremy Railton, best-known for his work on Pee-Wee's Playhouse, was responsible for the set design.

The full episode is available on YouTube.

References

External links 
 

1990 American television episodes
Television pilots not picked up as a series
American musical comedy television series